The Tangipahoa River originates northwest of McComb in southwest Mississippi, and runs south  through Lake Tangipahoa in Percy Quin State Park before passing into southeast Louisiana. There it flows entirely in the eponymous Tangipahoa Parish until its mouth opens into the northwest region of Lake Pontchartrain.

The Tangipahoa River was named after the Tangipahoa Indians.

According to the Geographic Names Information System, the Tangipahoa River has also been known as: 

Rio Tanchipaho
Taensapaoa River
Tanchipaho River
Tanchipao River
Tandgepao River
Tandgi-pao River
Tangipaho River
Tansypaho River
Tanzipao River
Taugipahoa River
Tuckepaw River
Big Tangipahoa River

See also
List of rivers of Mississippi
Percy Quin State Park
Sims Creek
Tangipohoa People
Tangipahoa, Louisiana
Tangipahoa Parish, Louisiana
Taensa People
Tickfaw River

References

External links
USGS Geographic Names Information System - Little Tangipahoa River
US EPA Tangipahoa Watershed
Army Corps of Engineers Map of the Tickfaw River
US Army Corps of Engineers River and Harbor Act Projects - New Orleans District

Rivers of Louisiana
Rivers of Mississippi
Rivers of Tangipahoa Parish, Louisiana
Bodies of water of Pike County, Mississippi
Bodies of water of Amite County, Mississippi
Bodies of water of Lincoln County, Mississippi
Tributaries of Lake Pontchartrain
Mississippi placenames of Native American origin
Louisiana placenames of Native American origin